Ramzy Khaled (born 2 June 1992), is an Egyptian footballer who plays for Egyptian Premier League side FC Masr as a defender.

Honours
Zamalek
Egypt Cup: 2015–16

References

External links
 
 

1992 births
Living people
People from Zagazig
Egyptian footballers
Association football defenders
Petrojet SC players
El Sharkia SC players
Al Ittihad Alexandria Club players
Zamalek SC players
Al Mokawloon Al Arab SC players
Wadi Degla SC players
Smouha SC players
FC Masr players
Egyptian Premier League players